Ali ibn Sulayman al-Assad (né al-Wahsh; 1875 – 1963) was a Syrian farmer, tribal leader, and religious authority best known as the father of former Syrian President Hafez al-Assad and grandfather of current Syrian President Bashar al-Assad.

Personal life
Ali ibn Sulayman al-Wahsh was the son of Sulayman ibn Ahmed ibn Ibrahim ibn Sulayman al-Wahsh. The al-Assad family lived in Qardaha, an Alawite town in the mountainous Latakia Sanjak of the Ottoman Empire. They are members of the Kalbiyya tribe.

Ali was known for protecting the weak, and in the 1920s had assisted refugees fleeing the former Aleppo province when France gave parts of it to Turkey. He was one of the few literate Alawites in his home village, and the only man in his village to subscribe to a newspaper. For his accomplishments, Ali was called al-Assad by his fellow Alawites, and made the nickname his surname in 1927.

Ali married 3 times and over three decades had eleven children. His first wife Sa'ada was from the district of Haffeh. They had three sons and two daughters. His second wife was Na'isa, twenty years younger than him. She was the daughter of Uthman Abbud from the village of Qutilba, about 12 kilometres further up the mountain. They had a daughter and five sons. Hafez was born on 6 October 1930 and was the fourth child.

Political influence
Ali ibn Sulayman al-Assad was one of the signatories of a supposed letter "No. 3547" addressed to French Prime Minister Léon Blum on 15 June 1936, which implored the French not to abandon Syria. However, historian Stefan Winter argues that this letter is a forgery. The disputed letter states: 

The letter praises the Jews in Palestine and includes them among the groups that are persecuted by the Muslims. It is possible that this aspect of the letter was not sincere but was intended to curry favor with Léon Blum, the French Prime Minister to whom it was addressed, who was a Jew.

On 31 August 2012, the permanent representative of France to the United Nations Gérard Araud mentioned the letter in response to the Syrian diplomat Bashar Jaafari.

See also
 Al-Assad family

Notes

References

Websites
 Stefan Winter: The Asad Petition of 1936: Bashar’s Grandfather Was Pro-Unionist, in: Syria Comment, 14 June 2016.

Bibliography
 
 
 

1875 births
1963 deaths
People from Latakia Governorate
Ali Sulayman